Kostyantyn Dudchenko (born 8 July 1986) is a Ukrainian professional football player who played in the Kazakhstan First Division for Taraz.

Career
He scored a winning goal in his debut with FC Khimki on 28 March 2010 in a 1–0 win against FC Salyut Belgorod.

In March 2014, Dudchenko moved from FC Shinnik Yaroslavl to FC Irtysh Pavlodar in the Kazakhstan Premier League.

Dudchenko left FC Tobol on 13 June 2016.

Career statistics

Club

Notes

References

External links

1986 births
Living people
People from Melitopol
Ukrainian footballers
Ukrainian expatriate footballers
Expatriate footballers in Russia
Expatriate footballers in Kazakhstan
Kazakhstan Premier League players
SC Olkom Melitopol players
FC Khimki players
FC Shinnik Yaroslavl players
FC Irtysh Pavlodar players
FC Tobol players
FC Akzhayik players
Ukrainian expatriate sportspeople in Russia
Ukrainian expatriate sportspeople in Kazakhstan
Association football forwards
Sportspeople from Zaporizhzhia Oblast